Chittagong is a city in south-eastern Bangladesh.

Chittagong may also refer to:

 Chittagong Division, an administrative division of Bangladesh
 Chittagong District, a district in the south-eastern region of Bangladesh
 Chittagong Hill Tracts, an area in south-eastern Bangladesh
 Chittagong, a 2012 Indian film based upon actual events about British India's (now in Bangladesh) Chittagong Uprising
 Port of Chittagong, the largest seaport in Bangladesh
 Chittagong Colony, a Bengali neighborhood in Karachi, Pakistan
 Chittagong Court Building, historical court house in Chittagong city.

See also
 Chittagonian (disambiguation)